Prabhupad (প্রভুপাদ) is a Bengali word originated from the language Sanskrit meaning, an honorary title or, a title used before the name of Vaishnava religious teachers. Since Medieval Bengali literature period "prabhupad" means lotus feet of Śrī Caitanya Mahāprabhu; see Prabhupāda.

Prabhupad - The following Hindu religious teachers also named by this word:-
Rupa Goswami Prabhupada (1489–1564), Pre-ISKCON
Bhaktisiddhanta Sarasvati Thakur Prabhupada (1874–1937), Pre-ISKCON and the spiritual master of A. C. Bhaktivedanta Swami Prabhupada.
A. C. Bhaktivedanta Swami Prabhupada (1896–1977), the founder of ISKCON